Myrren's Gift is the first book in the Quickening (series) trilogy by Fiona McIntosh. It details the journeys of Wyl Thirsk.

Plot introduction

All Wyl Thirsk ever wanted was for his family to be happy, to be loyal to his monarch, King Magnus, as his father was and, most importantly, to follow in the footsteps of his father, Fergys Thirsk.  But change is in the wind after Magnus married a foreign woman who gave him a cruel but handsome son – Prince Celimus.

References

2003 Australian novels
Australian fantasy novels
Novels by Fiona McIntosh
Voyager Books books